Burchill is a variant form of the English surname Birchall, deriving from the settlement of Biekel, Lancashire, and meaning Birch - hill.

Notable people named Burchill
Charlie Burchill, Scottish musician
Julie Burchill (born 1959), English writer
Katie Lea Burchill (aka Katarina Waters) (born 1980), English female professional wrestler
Mark Burchill (born 1980), Scottish international soccer player
Paul Burchill (aka Birchall) (born 1979), English wrestler
Thomas F. Burchill (1882–1955), American politician

See also
Birchall (surname)

References